is a Japanese athlete specialising in the long jump. She won a silver medal at the 2018 IAAF World U20 Championships. She later also won a silver at the 2019 Asian Championships.

Her personal bests in the event are 6.44 metres outdoors (+0.8 m/s, Gifu 2018) and 6.05 metres indoors (Tallinn 2019).

International competitions

References

2001 births
Living people
People from Nishinomiya
Japanese female long jumpers
Sportspeople from Hyōgo Prefecture
Competitors at the 2019 Summer Universiade
Japan Championships in Athletics winners
21st-century Japanese women